Dorstenia contensis is a plant species in the family Moraceae which is native to eastern Brazil.

References

contensis
Plants described in 1985
Flora of Brazil